School of Roars is a British children's TV series created by Alan Robinson. The show is about five monsters who go to a school for preschool monsters at night called the School of Roars to learn lessons whilst having fun with various activities. It was recommissioned for a second series.

Illustrated by Andrew Stiles

Premise
The show focuses on five little monsters named Wufflebump, Meepa, Icklewoo, Yummble, and Wingston through their nights of attending the School of Roars, where they're taught about how to deal with daily life problems by five big monsters named Miss Grizzlesniff, Mr. Marrow, Mrs. Twirlyhorn, Miss Sneezle, and Mr. Snapper.

Characters

Main
 Wufflebump (voiced by Che Grant) is a five-year-old purple "rhino" monster who lives in a volcano. He's the leader of the young monsters. He can be clumsy, as he often trips over his own tail. His Italian name is "Burlagiu".
 Icklewoo (voiced by Rosie Cooper-Kelly) is a three-year-old yellow "goat" monster who lives in a flower windmill. She doesn't roar as loud as the others do, as she's shy. Her Italian name is "Minilu".
 Yummble (voiced by Max Pattison) is a five-year-old orange monster with three eyes and legs who lives in a giant mushroom and loves to eat. He's the best friend of Wufflebump. Because of his appetite, he can have a hard keeping any kind of food where it is by gobbling it up and breaking the adults' rules of not eating them at the wrong times. He has tons of favourite foods. He is shown having super stretchy arms. His Italian name is "Iammi".
 Meepa (voiced by Ellie Gee) is a four-year-old green alien monster who lives in a tree flat and has four hands. She likes to say her name twice ("Meepa! "Meepa!"), as she can never stop talking. She has a love for monster animals. She has the most flexible body out of anyone in the School of Roars. Her Italian name is "Mipa".
 Wingston Waftywing (voiced by Ben Guiver) is a four-year-old blue "bat" monster who lives in a castle and is the smartest. He's depicted as the fastest monster in the school thanks to his wings, size, and energy, in the pilot, he is going to be female and named winona. His Italian name is "Wingy".
 Miss Grizzlesniff (voiced by Kathy Burke) is a pink-red tyrannosaurus rex-like monster and the teacher of the School of Roars. Her catchphrase is "Oh my claws!". She's one quirky teacher.

Recurring
 Miss Sneezle (voiced by Jess Robinson) is the school nurse.
 Miss Twirlyhorn (voiced by Sarah Lancashire) is the headmonstress of the School of Roars.
 Mr Marrow (voiced by Andrew Scott) is the chef who works in the café at the School of Roars.
 Mr Snapper (voiced by Andrew Scott) is a photographer that looks like a crocodile. He does not work at the School of Roars, but he visits when it is in need of a camera. 
 Mr Bogglelots (voiced by Andrew Scott) is the school optician.
 Mrs Wufflebump (voiced by Jess Robinson) is Wufflebump's mother
 Mr Wufflebump (voiced by Alan Robinson) is Wufflebump's father
 Growlbert (vocal effects provided by Alan Robinson) is Wufflebump and his parents’ pet monster dog
 Mr Yummble (voiced by Andrew Scott) is Yummble's father
 Mrs Yummble is Yummble's mother
 Yummble's baby brother 
 Yummble's baby sister 
 Meepa’s mummy 
 Meepa’s daddy 
 Icklewoo’s mummy
 Icklewoo’s daddy 
 Mr Waftywing (voiced by Andrew Scott) is Wingston's father. He  works as a mailman monster
 Granny Waftywing is Wingston's grandmother
 The Narrator (voiced by Andrew Scott). He begins every episode with the words "a super snuffle-some night at the School of Roars".

Episodes

Series 1

Series 2

Broadcast
CBeebies aired the show on its debut in 2017. Then, Universal Kids was next to acquire it in August the same year with it only airing the first 26 episodes. When it ended, Universal Kids permanently removed it in 2018, but airs on Nick Jr.,DeA Junior and Rai Yoyo in Italy, TG4 In Ireland and ABC Kids in Australia.

References

External links
Official Page at CBeebies

2010s British children's television series
British preschool education television series
British children's animated comedy television series
BBC children's television shows
CBeebies
Animated television series about children
Animated television series about monsters
Animated preschool education television series
2010s preschool education television series
English-language television shows